Try, Try Again may refer to:

In television episodes:
 "Try, Try Again" (Bigfoot Presents: Meteor and the Mighty Monster Trucks)
 "Try, Try Again" (The Brady Bunch)
 "Try, Try Again" (Eureka)
 "Try, Try Again" (Gawayn)
 "Try, Try Again" (Little People, Big World)

In other uses:
 Try, Try Again (film), a 1922 film starring James Parrott
 "Try Try Again", a song by Hank Williams, Jr. from Greatest Hits
 Try Try Again, a Thoroughbred racehorse whose offspring include Ribot

See also 
 "Try Try Try Again", a song by Dressy Bessy from Electrified
 "Try Again, Again" a 2006 song by Brian Posehn
 Try Again (disambiguation)